Nocardiopsis litoralis  is a Gram-positive, moderately halophilic, alkalitolerant and aerobic bacterium from the genus of Nocardiopsis which has been isolated from a sea anemone from the South China Sea near the Naozhou Island in China.

References

External links
Type strain of Nocardiopsis litoralis at BacDive -  the Bacterial Diversity Metadatabase	

Actinomycetales
Bacteria described in 2009